Courtessolium is a genus of trilobites in the order Phacopida that existed during the lower Ordovician in what is now France. It was described by Pribyl and Vanek in 1985, and the type species is Courtessolium prepater, which was originally described under the genus Pateraspis by Courtessole and Pillet in 1975, and was later renamed under the genus Pseudosphaerexochus. The new generic name, Courtessolium, honours one of the original authors of the species.

It was described from the Tremadoc erratic in Hérault.

References

External links
 Courtessolium at the Paleobiology Database

Cheiruridae
Phacopida genera
Ordovician trilobites of Europe
Fossils of France